Vulcan's Forge (1945–1951) was an American Thoroughbred racehorse who won the 1947 Champagne Stakes as a two-year-old,  the 1948 Withers Stakes, and in 1949 the prestigious Santa Anita and Suburban Handicaps.

As a three-year-old in 1948, Vulcan's Forge ran in two of the U.S. Triple Crown races. He did not compete in the Kentucky Derby but finished second in the Preakness Stakes and fourth in the Belmont Stakes.  On September 30, 1948, owner C. V. Whitney sold the colt for $80,000 through a Belmont Park auction to Isaac Collins.

On April 14, 1951, while at the Frances Keller Stables at Santa Anita Park in Arcadia, California, Vulcan's Forge fell ill with colic and died.

References

External links
 Vulcan's Forge's pedigree and partial racing stats

1945 racehorse births
1951 racehorse deaths
Thoroughbred family 4-c
Racehorses bred in Kentucky
Racehorses trained in the United States